Cubophis vudii, the  Bahamian racer, is a species of snake in the family Colubridae. The species is native to The Bahamas.

References

Cubophis
Snakes of North America
Reptiles described in 1862
Reptiles of the Bahamas
Endemic fauna of the Bahamas
Taxa named by Edward Drinker Cope